Zénith Paris (originally known as Zénith de Paris, ; and commonly referred to as Le Zénith) is a multi-purpose indoor arena in Paris, France. It is located in the Parc de la Villette in the 19th arrondissement on the edge of the Canal de l'Ourcq.  Its ability to seat up to 6,293 people makes it one of the largest venues in Paris.  The closest métro and RER stations are Porte de la Villette, Porte de Pantin, and Pantin.

It is the first venue to bear the moniker of Le Zénith; a theatre located in France with a minimum capacity of 3,000. Because of this, the venue in Paris simply referred to as "Le Zénith" in many forms of media.

History
The venue was built in 1983 to replace the Hippodrome de Pantin, a circus big-top which had become the main venue for touring rock bands visiting Paris (after the closing of the Pavillon de Paris). The Zénith was built on the same location as the old circus tent, and was designed by architects Philippe Chaix and Jean-Paul Morel on the initiative of Minister of Culture Jack Lang.  It was inaugurated by Renaud at the start of 1984.

Somewhat reminiscent of the Eiffel Tower, this hall was intended to be used for a fixed term of three years after which it was to be dismantled and replaced by a new hall nearby.  However, instead, its success gave birth to a chain of new halls throughout France, in Strasbourg, Toulouse, Montpellier, Nantes, Clermont-Ferrand, Rouen, Dijon, Pau, Toulon, Saint-Étienne, Caen, Orléans, Nancy, Amiens, Lille and Limoges. These halls are also named "Zénith", which is a trademark registered by COKER and the Ministry of Culture.

Concerts

See also
 Le Zénith
 Parc de la Villette
 Cité des Sciences et de l'Industrie, City of Science and Industry in Parc de la Villette
 La Géode, an IMAX domed theatre in Parc de la Villette
 Cité de la musique, City of Music, in Parc de la Villette

References

External links 

 

Music venues completed in 1984
Buildings and structures in the 19th arrondissement of Paris
Music venues in Paris
Indoor arenas in France
Sports venues completed in 1984
1984 establishments in France
Paris Eternal
Esports venues in France